In set theory, a branch of mathematics, the difference hierarchy over a pointclass is a hierarchy of larger pointclasses
generated by taking differences of sets. In usual notation, this set is denoted by 2-Γ. The next level of the hierarchy is denoted by 3-Γ and consists of differences of three sets:
. This definition can be extended recursively into the transfinite to α-Γ for some ordinal α.

In the Borel hierarchy, Felix Hausdorff and Kazimierz Kuratowski proved that the countable levels of the 
difference hierarchy over Π0γ give
Δ0γ+1.

References

Descriptive set theory
Mathematical logic hierarchies